Militello may refer to 3 Italian municipalities in Sicily:

Militello in Val di Catania, in the Province of Catania
Militello Rosmarino, in the Province of Messina
Sant'Agata di Militello, in the Province of Messina
Militello (surname), a surname